Torahiko is a masculine Japanese given name.

Possible writings
Torahiko can be written using different combinations of kanji characters. Some examples:

虎彦, "tiger, elegant boy"
虎比古, "tiger, young man (archaic)"
寅彦, "sign of the tiger (Chinese zodiac), elegant boy"
寅比古, "sign of the tiger (Chinese zodiac), young man (archaic)"

The name can also be written in hiragana とらひこ or katakana トラヒコ.

Notable people with the name
, Japanese swimmer
, Japanese shogi player
, Japanese physicist and writer

See also
6514 Torahiko, a main-belt asteroid

Japanese masculine given names